USS Gladwyne (PF-62), a , was the only ship of the United States Navy to be named for Gladwyne, Pennsylvania. Originally named Worcester after Worcester, Massachusetts, the name was changed in order to give it to new light cruiser  then under construction.

Construction
Gladwyne (PF-62), was launched on 7 January 1944, at the Globe Shipbuilding Company in Superior, Wisconsin, sponsored by Mrs. Phyllis M. Bennett; and commissioned on 21 November 1944.

Service history
After shakedown, Gladwyne sailed from Philadelphia, Pennsylvania, on 21 January 1945, for Casco Bay, Maine, arriving there two days later.  Following training exercises there, she made two round trip trans-Atlantic convoy escort voyages to Oran, Algeria, one each from New York and Norfolk, Virginia, from 6 February through 14 May 1945, returning to Boston, Massachusetts, each time. Refresher training at Casco Bay occupied June, and on 31 July, Gladwyne sailed from Boston via Panama to the Pacific.

On 29 August, Gladwyne and  sailed for the Marshall Islands to begin weather station and plane guard patrols.  The frigates reached Majuro on 5 September, and during the next months they alternated on patrolling their assigned area out of Majuro and later out of Kwajalein.  Gladwyne then sailed to Pearl Harbor putting in there on 27 December 1945.  Underway again on 23 February 1946, Gladwyne returned to Majuro and patrolled on weather station until mooring at San Francisco, California, on 9 April.

Decommissioned there on 15 April 1946, she was stricken from the Navy List on 8 October 1946 and sold to the Mexican Government on 24 November 1947.  She served Mexico as ARM Papaloapan until disposed of in 1965.

References

External links 
 
hazegray.org: USS Gladwyne

 

Tacoma-class frigates
Ships built in Superior, Wisconsin
1944 ships
World War II frigates and destroyer escorts of the United States
Tacoma-class frigates of the Mexican Navy